K. N. Palanisamy Gounder was an Indian politician and former member of the Legislative Assembly of Tamil Nadu. He was elected to the Tamil Nadu legislative assembly as an Indian National Congress candidate from Tiruppur constituency in 1957, and 1962 elections.

He did a lot to improve the Tirupur city, with basic infrastructure and brought water to the water scant city. For all his good deeds is regarded as Father of Tirupur.

References 

Indian National Congress politicians from Tamil Nadu
Living people
Year of birth missing (living people)